Vienna, City of My Dreams (German: Wien, du Stadt meiner Träume or Die Königin seines Herzens) is a 1928 German silent film directed by Victor Janson and starring Liane Haid, Luigi Serventi and Käthe von Nagy.

The film's sets were designed by the art director Robert Neppach.

Cast
 Liane Haid as Königin Viviane I.  
 Luigi Serventi as Prinzgemahl  
 Käthe von Nagy as Gräfin Mizzi Lichtenau  
 Kurt Vespermann as Graf Wetterstein, Adjutant  
 Adolphe Engers as Manager  
 Ferdinand von Alten as Hofmarschall 
 Ida Wüst as Hofdame 
 Ernst Hofmann 
 Antonie Jaeckel

References

Bibliography
 Bock, Hans-Michael & Bergfelder, Tim. The Concise CineGraph. Encyclopedia of German Cinema. Berghahn Books, 2009.

External links

1928 films
Films of the Weimar Republic
German silent feature films
Films directed by Victor Janson
German black-and-white films